In digital music processing technology, quantization is the studio-software process of transforming performed musical notes, which may have some imprecision due to expressive performance, to an underlying musical representation that eliminates the imprecision. The process results in notes being set on beats and on exact fractions of beats.

The purpose of quantization in music processing is to provide a more beat-accurate timing of sounds. Quantization is frequently applied to a record of MIDI notes created by the use of a musical keyboard or drum machine. Additionally, the phrase "pitch quantization" can refer to pitch correction used in audio production, such as using Auto-Tune.

Description
A frequent application of quantization in this context lies within MIDI application software or hardware. MIDI sequencers typically include quantization in their manifest of edit commands. In this case, the dimensions of this timing grid are set beforehand. When one instructs the music application to quantize a certain group of MIDI notes in a song, the program moves each note to the closest point on the timing grid. Quantization in MIDI is usually applied to Note On messages and sometimes Note Off messages; some digital audio workstations shift the entire note by moving both messages together. Sometimes quantization is applied in terms of a percentage, to partially align the notes to a certain beat. Using a percentage of quantization allows for the subtle preservation of some natural human timing nuances.

The most difficult problem in quantization is determining which rhythmic fluctuations are imprecise or expressive (and should be removed by the quantization process) and which should be represented in the output score. For instance, a simple children's song should probably have very coarse quantization, resulting in few different notes in output. On the other hand, quantizing a performance of a piano piece by Arnold Schoenberg, for instance, should result in many smaller notes, tuplets, etc.

In recent years audio quantization has come into play, with the plug-in Beat Detective on all versions of Pro Tools being used regularly on modern-day records to tighten the playing of drums, guitar, bass, etc.

See also
 Note value
 Time signature

References

Audio editors
Music production